Ushicon was an annual three day anime convention held during February at the Courtyard by Marriott Austin Pflugerville and Pflugerville Conference Center in Pflugerville, Texas. The convention resumed operation in 2011 as an 18-and-older event. It was originally held in Austin, Texas, from 2002 to 2006 until ceasing operations due to changes in anime fandom and facility issues.

History
Ushicon did not return after 2006 due to issues with convention facilities in Austin not being able to handle 2,500-5,000 attendees and changes in the fandom that did not match with the goals of Ushicon. In 2007 a free "Block Party" was held to celebrate the American release of Princess Tutu with support from ADV Films. The event featured cast members from the American and Japanese releases, along with the series creator. In 2010, Chibi Ushicon was the convention's first 18 & older convention, with Ushicon returning as a full 18 & older convention in 2011. Ushicon in 2022 announced there would be no further conventions.

Event history 2002-2006

Ushiko's Anime Block Party 2007

Chibi Ushicon 2010

Event history 2011-

References

External links
Ushicon official website

Defunct anime conventions
Recurring events established in 2002
2002 establishments in Texas
Annual events in Texas
Conventions in Texas
Festivals in Texas
Japanese-American culture in Texas
Tourist attractions in Travis County, Texas